There have been 38 different coaches who have taken the role as manager of the Netherlands national football team. The team's first coach was Cees van Hasselt, who took charge of their first match against Belgium in 1905. Bob Glendenning holds the record for the longest tenure as Netherlands coach, having served in the role for a total of 16 years over two spells: in 1923, and from 1925 to 1940. He also coached the Netherlands team the most times in history with 87 matches, 25 more than second-placed coach Dick Advocaat. Advocaat has the most wins as coach, with 37 to Glendenning's 36.

Managers

References

Lists of national association football team managers